The Punisher is a five-issue comic book limited series published by Marvel Comics in 1986, starring the fictional vigilante the Punisher. It was written by Steven Grant, and illustrated by Mike Zeck and Mike Vosburg.

Background
In the early 1980s, Grant and Zeck proposed creating a Punisher miniseries. The company was initially uncomfortable with the idea of a protagonist who killed in cold blood. However, as crime increased nationally throughout the decade, Marvel responded by testing the market for such a character and then publishing, though not initially promoting, a miniseries that debuted in January 1986. The initial issue had a banner indicating that the series would be four issues long; however, the series had always been intended to have five issues, and the banner was an error that recurred throughout the entire run except for issue #2, which says "2 of 5".

In keeping with its hard-boiled premise, The Punisher included several events rare in Marvel Comics publishing in the mid-1980s: a suicide, the death of an innocent child, and the main character having sexual intercourse. In issue #4, the warden of Rykers Prison (who assisted in the Punisher's prison break) committed suicide when faced with the options of battling the Punisher or going to prison himself. In issue #3, Marcus Coriander, a small-time numbers runner used as a proxy crime boss by the Kingpin, accidentally kills an innocent girl while exchanging gunfire with the Punisher. In issue #2, the Punisher is nursed back to health by Angela, a plant by Punisher's enemies "The Trust". In one panel, Angela states that "everything I have is yours". In the next panel, the Punisher is shown walking away from a bed containing a nude Angela, indicating that they had sex.

Publication history
Due to a production error, issues #1, #3, and #4 have banners promoting a four-issue limited series as originally intended; issues #2 and #5 promote a five-issue series (the first and last issues were due to be double-sized, but the last one was split). Mike Zeck was the artist on the first four issues and Mike Vosburg was the penciller of #5. The splash page of issue #5 has a caption stating, "Special thanks to true pros Mike Vosburg (pencils), Jo Duffy (script), and Big John Beatty (inks)." The covers were paintings by Mike Zeck and Phil Zimelman.

Plot

"Circle of Blood"
Newly imprisoned in Rykers following the events of The Spectacular Spider Man #78-83, the Punisher is sprung from jail by the Trust, a citizens organization whose purpose is to fight crime using the Punisher’s example by brainwashing criminals and making them part of their "Punishment Squad". This group wears uniforms similar to the Punisher's and kills criminals. A man named Alaric is in charge of this operation.

"Back to the War"
After being rescued by Angela, an operative of the Trust, the Punisher falsely tells Ben Urich that he has killed the Kingpin, who actually staged his own death. The purpose of this is to start a gang war where the criminals will kill themselves. This occurs, but the Punisher then becomes concerned by the large number of innocent people caught in the crossfire.

"Slaughterday"
The Punisher forces mob leaders (at gunpoint) to have a meeting to stop the gang war. Force is necessary, because the Trust had previously used a purported gang meeting to kill a number of criminals.

"Final Solution"
Betrayed by The Trust, The Punisher attacks Alaric's home only to find that Jigsaw has been brainwashed and is made a member of the Punishment Squad. The Punisher defeats Jigsaw, but is captured by Alaric and placed in the conditioning room.

"Final Solution, Part 2"
The Punisher escapes the brainwashing room because his weapons and clothing were not removed when he was put there. The Punisher then forces Alaric to implicate the Trust in his prison break and the Punishment Squad's murders. While leaving the mansion, the Punisher is seen by Angela who sits in a jeep on the mansion bridge waiting for Alaric. Jumping to the conclusion that Frank killed her lover, she guns the jeep towards him. Frank shoots the jeep's grill, forcing Angela off the road, precariously situated on the railing of bridge. Frank walks away as the jeep begins to slip.

Prints

Issues 

 Circle of Blood (January 1986)
 Back to the War (February 1986)
 Slaughter Day (March 1986)
 Final Solution (April 1986)
 Final Solution, Part 2 (April 1986)

Collected editions
The series was reprinted in The Punisher Magazine issues 1-3 (1989) in oversized format. It has been collected into a single volume title Circle of Blood as a softcover (1989) and a hardcover (2007). The complete series is also included in the black-and-white Essential Punisher, Vol. 1 (2004).

References

External links

The Punisher at Don Markstein's Toonopedia

1986 comics debuts
Defunct American comics
Comics set in New York City
Crime comics